The Traffic Engineering Database is a database used to store traffic engineering information when setting up a link with RSVP-TE.

References 

Transportation engineering
Road traffic management
Surveillance
Intelligent transportation systems